The FFA State Institute Challenge was a youth soccer tournament organised by Football Federation Australia. The tournament was held between 2009 and 2014 at the Australian Institute of Sport headquarters in Canberra, Australia.

Format
Within a group stage, the FFA Technical Committee awarded daily bonus points for the states that played most in line with the FFA’s National Curriculum criteria, with extra bonus points based on these criteria at the end of the stage. The group stage winner played a Final against the state with the most bonus points. The winner of the final then played against an All-Star team composed of the best players in that year's tournament.

Participating states
  ACT Academy of Sport Football Program (ACT)
  Northern New South Wales Institute of Sport Football Program (NSW)
  FNSW NTC (NSW)
  Northern Territory National Training Centre (NT)
  Queensland Academy of Sport Football Program (QLD)
  South Australian National Training Centre (SA)
  Tasmanian National Training Centre (TAS)
  FFV NTC (VIC)
  FW NTC (WA)

Tournament final winners

References

2009 establishments in Australia
Football Australia